The Complete Albums Collection is a series by Legacy Recordings including:

The Complete Albums Collection (Judas Priest box set)
The Complete Albums Collection 2013   Box set by Paul Simon
The Complete Albums Collection 2014 Box set by Simon & Garfunkel
The Complete Album Collection 2017 Box set by Tim Buckley
The Complete Album Collection 2012 Box set by Charles Mingus
The Complete Album Collection 2014 Box set by Billy Joel
The Complete Albums Collection 2017 Box set by Rob Halford